Žarko Zrenjanin "Uča" (11 September 1902 – 4 November 1942) was a Yugoslav partisan and National Hero of Yugoslavia. The city of Zrenjanin, in Serbia, is named after him, since 1946.

Zrenjanin was born in Izbište. He became a leader of the Vojvodina Communists and when World War II began, the Partisans. Zrenjanin endured torture and months of incarceration by the Nazis during the Second World War. He was released and later killed in Pavliš while trying to escape recapture.

References

1902 births
1942 deaths
People from Vršac
Yugoslav communists
Yugoslav guerrillas
Yugoslav Partisans members
Serbian people of World War II
Recipients of the Order of the People's Hero
Resistance members killed by Nazi Germany